Phonetic Extensions Supplement is a Unicode block containing characters for specialized and deprecated forms of the International Phonetic Alphabet.

Block

History
The following Unicode-related documents record the purpose and process of defining specific characters in the Phonetic Extensions Supplement block:

See also 
 Greek alphabet in Unicode
 Latin script in Unicode

References 

Unicode blocks